Ireneusz Adamski (born 22 August 1974) is a retired Polish football defender.

References

1974 births
Living people
Polish footballers
Association football midfielders
Śląsk Wrocław players
Górnik Polkowice players
Ruch Chorzów players
LZS Piotrówka players
Ekstraklasa players
I liga players
People from Polkowice